This article describes the group stage of the 2016–17 Women's EHF Champions League.

Draw
The draw was held on 1 July 2016 at 13:00 in Vienna, Austria.

Seedings
The seedings were announced on 27 June 2016.

Groups
The matchdays were 14–16 October, 21–23 October, 28–30 October, 4–6 November, 11–13 November, 18–20 November 2016.

Group A

Group B

Group C

Group D

References

External links
Official website

Group stage